Rockdale is an unincorporated community on Cross Creek in Brooke County, West Virginia, United States.

References

Unincorporated communities in Brooke County, West Virginia
Unincorporated communities in West Virginia